Escomb is a village on the River Wear about  west of Bishop Auckland, County Durham, England. Escomb was a civil parish until 1960, when it and a number of other civil parishes in the area were dissolved. In 2001 it had a population of 358. In 2011 the ward had a population of 3323.

Parish churches
Escomb Church was built in the 7th or 8th century AD when the area was part of the Anglian Kingdom of Northumbria, and has been called "England's earliest complete church". The building includes long-and-short quoins characteristic of Anglo-Saxon architecture, and re-used Roman masonry from Binchester Roman Fort.

Until the 19th century Escomb was a dependent chapelry of Bishop Auckland. In 1848 a vicarage was built at the top of the hill and Rev. Henry Atkinson became Escomb's first resident vicar for centuries.

The Anglo-Saxon church seated only 65 people, and in the 19th century Escomb's population outgrew it. In 1863 a new parish church, St John's, was completed next to the vicarage.

Thereafter the old church repeatedly fell into disrepair. It was restored in 1875–80 by RJ Johnson, again in 1927, and again in 1965 by Sir Albert Richardson.

In the 20th century church attendance declined and became too small for St John's. In 1969 the Anglo-Saxon church reverted to being the parish church, and in 1971 St John's was demolished.

Economic history
The George Pit coal mine was sunk in 1837, and an ironworks was opened at Witton Park in 1846.

In 1843 the Bishop Auckland and Weardale Railway was opened between Shildon Junction and Crook to take coal from the area. It passes Escomb but its nearest stop was Etherley railway station, which had been opened by 1847. The line was worked initially by the Stockton and Darlington Railway, through which it became part of the North Eastern Railway in 1863.

WC Stobart & Co's Etherley Colliery was Escomb's major employer from the middle of the 19th century until the seams of its pits became exhausted in the 1920s. The 1851 Census recorded 1,293 inhabitants of Escomb, most of whom worked at the pit.

British Rail closed the Bishop Auckland and Weardale line to passenger traffic in 1965 and to freight traffic in 1993. The Weardale Railway reopened the section past Escomb and through Etherley shortly thereafter.

See also
 Escomb Bridge

Amenities
Escomb has a public house, the Saxon Inn, that was built in the 17th century.

The village has a primary school.

References

Sources

External links

Villages in County Durham